Vlachs of North Macedonia may refer to:

 Aromanians, commonly known as "Vlachs" in North Macedonia
 Aromanians in North Macedonia
 Megleno-Romanians, also commonly known as "Vlachs" in the country